Robert Bruce "Bob" Usdane (March 11, 1936 – January 4, 2011) was an American, Republican politician.

Usdane served in the Arizona Senate from 1977 to 1991 and was President of the Arizona Senate. At the time of his death Usdane resided in Scottsdale, Arizona.

Notes

External links

Republican Party Arizona state senators
Presidents of the Arizona Senate
1936 births
2011 deaths
Politicians from Scottsdale, Arizona